Harry Freeman (4 November 1918 – 19 March 1997) was a professional association footballer who played as a full back. He played for Fulham between 1937 and 1952 (although this spell was split by the outbreak of the Second World War. He played 179 league matches and scored 7 goals. He made 190 appearances in all competitions for the club, scoring 8 goals. He spent about 3 years based at Kempston Barracks in Bedfordshire, he was married to Olive who moved up and stayed with Mr and Mrs Childerly in Margetts Rd.

After leaving Fulham his League career continued at Walsall, after which he played non-league football at Dover and initially as a player then player-manager at Ashford Town (Kent).

References

Association football defenders
Fulham F.C. players
Ashford United F.C. players
Ashford United F.C. managers
1918 births
1997 deaths
English footballers